Colona may refer to:

Places
 Colona, a former sheep station near Yalata, South Australia
 Colona, Colorado, United States
 Colona, Illinois, United States

Other uses
 Colona (plant), a genus of plants in the family Malvaceae
 Edgardo Colona (1846–1904), British stage actor